The first cabinet of Paavo Lipponen was the 66th government of Finland, which existed from 13 April 1995 to 15 April 1999. The cabinet’s Prime Minister was Paavo Lipponen. It was a majority government, and one of the longest-running governments in Finnish history. Lipponen's first government ran for a whole term of a Finnish cabinet, or 1 464 days in total. The cabinet was composed of a coalition formed by the Social Democratic Party, the National Coalition Party, the Swedish People's Party, the Left Alliance, and the Green League. Due to the cabinet containing five separate parties from all over Finland's political spectrum, both of Lipponen's cabinets were considered rainbow coalitions (Finnish: sateenkaarihallitukset).

Ministers

See also
Paavo Lipponen's second Cabinet

References

Lipponen, 1
1995 establishments in Finland
1999 disestablishments in Finland
Cabinets established in 1995
Cabinets disestablished in 1999